Kuchera is a Town and a municipality in Nagaur district in the Indian state of Rajasthan.

History

On conquering Ahmedabad Maharaja Abhey Singh awarded a village known as Kuchera to the Mirdha family. When Maharaja Bhakt Singh, 1751 A.D., came to power he gave Mangal Ram Mirdha, the then Chief Postal Administrator, the village Silas. An additional gift was made to the Mirdhas by giving them power to collect land revenue up to Rs.500 annually.

References

Cities and towns in Nagaur district